is a Japanese photographer.

His work is included in the collection of the Museum of Fine Arts Houston, and the Art Institute of Chicago.

References

Japanese photographers
1944 births
Living people
Place of birth missing (living people)
Date of birth missing (living people)